Frank Huger, a son of Gen Benjamin Huger, served as a Confederate artilleryman in the American Civil War.

Pre-war
Francis (Frank) Kinloch Huger, a son of Benjamin Huger and Elizabeth Celestine Pinckney, was born in Norfolk, Virginia in 1837. Like his father, Huger attended the United States Military Academy at West Point.  He graduated from west Point in 1860 and was assigned to the 10th U.S. Infantry as a second lieutenant. Huger resigned his commission on May 21, 1861 to join the Confederate cause.

Civil War service

Frank Huger entered the Confederate service, as did his father. Commissioned a captain, Huger led the Norfolk Light Artillery. The battery was attached to the brigade of Brig. Gen. Ambrose R. Wright in the elder Huger’s division in the Seven Days Battles. At the Second Battle of Bull Run and the Battle of Fredericksburg his battery was attached to the division of Maj. Gen. Richard H. Anderson. He was absent from the Battle of Antietam, when it was led by Lt. C. R. Phelps. Huger’s guns were involved, together with the brigade of Brig. Gen. Cadmus Wilcox, in the Battle of Salem Church. 

Huger was promoted to major on March 2, 1863. At first, he was second in command of a battalion of artillery led by Col. Edward Porter Alexander. Alexander welcomed Huger, describing him later as "my glorious & beloved Frank Huger, who never shirked a care or danger or grumbled over a hardship in his life..." In that capacity, Huger served in the Battle of Chancellorsville, including bombarding federal lines from high ground at Hazel Grove on May 3, 1863. Huger was sent on May 4 to support the division of Maj. Gen. Richard H. Anderson in the Battle of Salem Church. His guns were among those that fired the last shots of the battle the next day, as the Union VI Corps retreated across the Rappahannock River.  At the Battle of Gettysburg, Huger was involved in supporting the attack of Lt. Gen. James Longstreet's corps on the federal left on July 2. During July 3 Huger took immediate command of the guns as Alexander was assigned responsibility for the bombardment preceding Pickett's Charge.

Huger went West with Longstreet's Corps, but he arrived too late for the Battle of Chickamauga. When Longstreet moved into eastern Tennessee to evict federal forces, Alexander served as his chief of artillery.  Huger consequently commanded Alexander’s battalion in the Knoxville Campaign. When Alexander became the permanent chief of corps artillery in late 1863, Huger officially took over command of the battalion. He rose to the rank of lieutenant colonel shortly thereafter, being promoted on February 27, 1864.

Huger's battalion served in the Overland Campaign and the Siege of Petersburg. In Alexander’s absence, he was temporarily in charge of the artillery of the First Corps posted near Elliott's Salient at the time of the Battle of the Crater. At the height of the Union attack on July 30, 1864, following the explosion of the mine under the Salient, Huger was seen helping work a gun along with members of Alexander's staff. Huger was promoted to the rank of colonel on February 18, 1865. He was captured during the Battle of Sailors' Creek by Union cavalry led by Brig. Gen. George A. Custer, a fellow West Point graduate (Class of 1861). Huger was treated by Custer more like a guest than a prisoner.

Post war

After the war, Frank Huger became involved in railroads. He died in 1897.

Notes

References
 Alexander, Edward Porter, Fighting for the Confederacy, ed. Gary W. Gallagher, Chapel Hill: University of North Carolina Press, 1989.  
 Sibley, F. Ray, Junior, The Confederate Order of Battle, volume 1, The Army of Northern Virginia, Shippensburg, PA: White Mane, 1996.
 Sifakis, Stewart, Who Was Who in the Civil War, New York: Facts on File, 1988.
 Wise, Jennings C., The Long Arm of Lee: the History of the Artillery of the Army of Northern Virginia, New York: Oxford University Press, 1959.

External links

1837 births
1897 deaths
Confederate States Army officers
People of Virginia in the American Civil War
United States Army officers
United States Military Academy alumni